The chairman or chairwoman of the Crow Nation is the head of the executive branch of the Crow Nation of Montana. Every four years, the Crow Tribal General Council (all adult-aged registered voters) elects a chairman of the Executive Branch.

The current chairman is Frank Whiteclay. The chairman serves as chief executive officer, with enumerated powers in the 2001 Crow Constitution. The constitutional changes of 2001 created a three branch government. The chairman serves as the head of the executive branch, which includes the offices of vice-chairman, secretary, and vice-secretary and the tribal offices and departments of the Crow Tribal Administration. Notable chairmen were Clara Nomee, Edison Real Bird, and Robert Yellowtail.

See list of Crow Tribal Administrations.

Notes and references 

 
Crow tribe
Titles and offices of Native American leaders